This list of compositions by Jan Dismas Zelenka was indexed in accordance with Wolfgang Reiche's thematic catalogue "Jan Dismas Zelenka: Thematisch-systematisches Verzeichnis der musikalischen Werke (ZWV)", Dresden, 1985. It includes vocal-instrumental (masses, requiems, oratoria, psalms, hymns, litanies, operatic works, melodrama, processionals, antiphons, arias, motets, short liturgical and spiritual compositions), instrumental and orchestral works (sonatas, sinfonias, concerto, etc.).

Confirmed works

Selection of lost or doubtful works 
ZWV 200: Missa, (C)
ZWV 201: Credo, (D)
ZWV 202: Sanctus, Agnus, (G), c. 1725
ZWV 204: Salve Regina, (a), c. 1719
ZWV 205: Salve Regina, (F)
ZWV 206: Benedictus Dominus, (g), c. 1723
ZWV 207: Benedictus sit Deus Pater, (D), c. 1729
ZWV 208: Graduale Propter veritatem, (F)
ZWV 209: Sollicitus fossor, (Motet; D), c. 1730
ZWV 210: Veni Sancte Spiritus, (D), c. 1739
ZWV 211: Qui nihil sortis felicitis, (Motet; B), 1730
ZWV 212: Trumpet Fanfares, (6 pieces), c. 1722
ZWV 213: Mass, (D)
ZWV 214: Mass, (D)
ZWV 215: Mass, (g)
ZWV 216: Credo, (D)
ZWV 217: Salve Regina duplex, (F)
ZWV 218: Salve Regina
ZWV 219: Salve Regina
ZWV 220: Cantiones sacrae, (18) (Giovanni Palestrina ?), 2nd Motet Book)
ZWV 221: O sing unto the Lord, (Anthem) (19th century transcription)
ZWV 230: Agnus Dei, (a) (listed in inventarium)
ZWV 231: Aria animae poenitentis, (c) (listed in inventarium)
ZWV 232: Ave Regina, (a) (listed in inventarium)
ZWV 233: Eja triumphos pangite, (Offertorium; C), pre-1715 ?
ZWV 234: Gaudia mille, (Motet; C) (listed in inventarium)
ZWV 236: Iste Confessore, (Hymn; C) (listed in inventarium)
ZWV 240: Missa Sanctae Conservationis (lost)
ZWV 241: Missa Theophorica a 2 Cori (listed in inventarium)
ZWV 242: Missa tranquilli animi
ZWV 243: Quid statis. De Beata Virgine Maria (listed in inventarium)
ZWV 244: Tantum ergo, (c)
ZWV 245: Via laureata, (school drama), 1704 (lost)
ZWV 247: Requiem, 1724?
ZWV 248: Missa in honorem B. Alberti Magni, (D)
ZWV 249: Missa, (D)

References

External links

Zelenka, Jan Dismas
Zelenka, Jan Dismas